Chadi also known as Lakshman Nagar is a village in Phalodi tehsil of Jodhpur district in Rajasthan. It contain a vast area in the marwar region. It has a variety of flora and fauna like desert deer, black buck deer and trees and bushes like khejdi and other desert plants.

Some new zamindars were old rajas

Area

It is in the Western Rajasthan of India. The district is bounded by Nagaur District.

Chadi is a village in Phalodi Mandal in Jodhpur District in Rajasthan State in India. Chadi is 96.24 km distance from its District main city Jodhpur and 273 km distance from its State main city Jaipur.  Nearby villages are Ridmalsar (4.4 km), Poonasar (7.5 km), Ishru (11. km), Champasar (13. km), Jakhan (14. km), Bapini (17. km), Jaisala (21. km).

Other villages in 342312 are Jakhan, Laxman Nagar, Ridmalsar, Raimalwara, Khindakore                             Sutharo ki dhani laxman nagar ramdev pura (3.km)

Government and commercial buildings

Schools near by Chadi

bhatnadiya
sri krishan nagar 
Capt BR Bishnoi Bana home to laxaman nagar link road
govt.sec school chadi
govt. higher school laxmannagar
govt. sec. school sutharo ki dhani ramdev pure

Banks near by Chadi

UCO BANK, CHADI
IFSC CODE : UCBA0001099.
MICR CODE : 342028511.
uco bank atm
UCO BANK, PEELWA
IFSC CODE : UCBA0001067.
MICR CODE : 342028507.

BANK OF BARODA, PHALODI, RAJASTHAN
IFSC CODE : barb0phajod.
MICR CODE : non micr.

ALLAHABAD BANK, PHALODI
IFSC CODE : alla0212400.
MICR CODE : non-micr.

Flora and fauna 

Much of this area is harsh and come in marwar region which means land of dryness and death. The domestic animal are cow speed and camels but horses make a very important role in every day living because horses of this area are strong and known as marwari horses which means living being of marwar .

The area also contains black buck and chinkara deer, rare wild desert fox and Indian wild neeligay (Indian deer). Hunting of black buck and chikara was a very popular sport played by the royal zamindar family.

Marwari horses 

Traditional rulers of the Marwar region of western India, were the first to breed the Marwari. Beginning in the 12th century, they espoused strict breeding that promoted purity and hardiness. Used throughout history as a cavalry horse by the people of the Marwar region, the Marwari was noted for its loyalty and bravery in battle. The breed deteriorated in the 1930s, when poor management practices resulted in a reduction of the breeding stock, but today has regained some of its popularity

The rulers of Marwar and the Rajput cavalry were the traditional breeders of the Marwari. The Rathores were forced from their Kingdom of Kanauj in 1193, and withdrew into the Great Indian and Thar Deserts. The Marwari was vital to their survival, and during the 12th century they followed strict selective breeding processes, keeping the finest stallions for the use of their subjects.

Position in Rajasthan politics 
The royal family has a unique and special palace in Rajasthan politics. They have a continuing place in the ruling of Marwar and not only Marwar, but the whole Rajasthan.
The last ruler of lashman nagar, nathuram ji maderna was the last landlord of lashman nagar. His son parasram maderna had made the maderna family one of the most top number ranking political family of Rajasthan.

Membership of Legislature

1957 - 1962 - Member, Second Rajasthan Legislative Assembly
1962 - 1967 - Member, Third Rajasthan Legislative Assembly
1967 - 1972 - Member, Fourth Rajasthan Legislative Assembly
1972 - 1977 - Member, Fifth Rajasthan Legislative Assembly
1977 - 1980 - Member, Sixth Rajasthan Legislative Assembly
1980 - 1985 - Member, Seventh Rajasthan Legislative Assembly
1990 - 1992 - Member, Ninth Rajasthan Legislative Assembly
1993 - 1998 - Member, Tenth Rajasthan Legislative Assembly
1998 - 2003 - Member, Eleventh Rajasthan Legislative Assembly

Positions held

1953 - 1956 - Sarpanch, Village - Chadi, District -Jodhpur
1957 - 1962 - Member of PAC and Estimates Committee
1961 - 1962 -
1987 - 1990 - Chairman, Central Cooperative Bank Ltd, Jodhpur
1962 - 1966 - Dy. Minister, Deptt of General Administration
1966 - 1977 - Minister Deptt of GAD, Revenue, Panchayat Raj, Cooperative, Forest, Colonization, Rehabilitation, Flood, Famine, Agriculture, Animal Husbandry, Community Development, Local Bodies and Sheep & Wool, Government of Rajasthan
1974 - 1977 - Dy. Leader of INC Party in the Assembly
1977 - 1978,
Feb'1979 - Aug'1979, and 1993–1998, Leader of Opposition, Rajasthan Legislative Assembly
1980 - 1981 - Chairman, Committee on Subordinate Legislation
1981 - 1982 - Minister, Deptt of Irrigation, PHED, Revenue, Land Reforms, Energy, and Flood & Famine, Government of Rajasthan
1981 - 1985 - Member, Syndicate, Jodhpur University
1982 - 1985 - Minister, Deptt of Irrigation, PHED, and Ground Water, Govt of Rajasthan
1990 - 1992 - Chairman, Public Accounts Committee
1994 - 1998 - Chairman, Public Undertakings Committee
6 Jan 1999 to 15 Jan 2004 Speaker, Rajasthan Legislative

He ruled this area for 50 long  years and now his two sons are taking over this rich heritage.

References

Geography of Rajasthan
Villages in Jodhpur district